Charles L. Lewis was the fifth head football coach at Tuskegee University in Tuskegee, Alabama and he held that position for two seasons, from 1915 until 1916.  His coaching record at Tuskegee was 5–4–2.

References

Year of birth missing
Year of death missing
Tuskegee Golden Tigers football coaches